2013 UEFA Women's Under-19 Championship Second Qualifying Round will be the first round of qualifications for the Final Tournament of 2013 UEFA Women's Under-19 Championship, which will be held in Wales. The first matches will be played on 4 April 2013.

England, France and Germany received byes to the second round as the sides with the highest coefficients.

Format
24 team are drawn into six groups of four. The teams then play each other once. After that the group winners and the best runner-up advance to the final tournament.

Seedings
The draw was held on 20 November 2012 in Nyon. Teams are seeded based on their first round performances. In the draw one team per pot will be drawn together. No team can meet a team they played in the first qualifying round.

The hosts of the four one-venue mini-tournament groups are indicated below in italics.

Tiebreakers
Tie-breakers between teams with the same number of points are:
 Higher number of points obtained in the matches played between the teams in question
 Superior goal difference resulting from the matches played between the teams in question
 Higher number of goals scored in the matches played between the teams in question
If now two teams still are tied, reapply tie-breakers 1-3, if this does not break the tie, go on.
 Superior goal difference in all group matches
 Higher number of goals scored in all group matches
 Drawing of lots

Group 1
Group 1 was played in the Netherlands.

Group 2
Group 2 was played in Belgium.

Group 3
Group 3 was played in the Scotland.

Group 4
Group 4 was played in Norway. Norway qualified as runners-up with the best record.

Group 5
Group 5 was played in Portugal.

Group 6
Group 6 was played in Germany.

Ranking of group runners-up
In the ranking of the second-place finishers, only the results against the first and third teams count.

References

External links
UEFA.com; official website
Round on soccerway.com

1
2013 second
2013 in women's association football
2013 in youth sport